Dirk Erich Markus (born January 15, 1971) is a German-born entrepreneur. He is the co-founder and Chief Executive Officer of pan-European investment group Aurelius.  From an initial investment of €500,000 invested in 2005, Markus created one of Europe's largest private equity and asset management groups with revenues of over €4 billion.

Early life 
Markus was born in Regensburg, Germany to parents Manfred and Ingrid Markus. As a child he moved to Austria where his father was professor of Anglistics at the University of Innsbruck and his mother was a teacher. Markus studied Business Administration with a minor in Russian at the University of St. Gallen, Switzerland. He received his doctorate in "Strategic Cooperation in the Multimedia Industry" from St. Gallen and was a visiting research fellow at Harvard University.

Career 
Markus started his career as a management consultant with McKinsey, where he focused on cost reduction as well as growth programs. He then founded Mercateo, an online business procurement platform where he was responsible for finance and corporate development. Following the sale of Mercateo to German utility E.ON, he co-founded a publicly owned industrial holding company.

Together with Gert Purkert, Markus co-founded investment company Aurelius in 2005. With startup capital of €500,000, they began acquiring companies in special situations and in periods of radical change.  Today, Aurelius is a well-known pan-European private equity group. Its publicly traded fund Aurelius Equity Opportunities consisted of 22 subsidiaries generating a turnover of approximately €4 billion in the 2017 financial year.

Personal life 
Markus moved to London in 2013 and this is where he currently lives. In 1988, he set the tyrolean track & field record for 3×1000 m in the men's under-18 category. This record is still held today. In addition, Markus is a passionate racing cyclist, completing the 2017 Castle Ride in Tonbridge, Kent, at a time of 08:03:32. Markus is also an avid art collector and has a collection of over 350 socialist propaganda posters.

References 

1971 births
Living people
People from Regensburg
German company founders
University of St. Gallen alumni
21st-century German businesspeople
German expatriates in Switzerland